Chapri, meaning in  English is Hut, is a village and union council of the Mianwali District in the Punjab province of Pakistan. The people of the area are educated and hard working. Most of the people are employed in Army Apart from doing Jobs in other govt Department. Sub (R)  Khiyal Mir Khattak was the leader who started the political process in Chapri particularly known as Khattak belt. He contested the provisional assembly elections but because of own people disunity he lost the election. He worked hard to bring the Khattak tribe on one page. 
There are other notables in the Chapri who not only went to higher ranks in commission cadre of Pakistan Army but working hard for the Khattak belt unity.  Among them are Lt Col (r)  Shaista Mir Khattak,  Lt Col Dr Saeed Khattak,  Lt Col Rasheed Khattak,  are few ones.

Chapri lies adjacent to Karak District of Khyber Pakhtunkhwa.

References 

Union councils of Mianwali District